Gresel is a river in the state of Hesse, Germany. It flows into the Giesel in Fulda-Zirkenbach.

See also
List of rivers of Hesse

Rivers of Hesse
Rivers of Germany

de:Gresel (Giesel)